Sogamoso River is a river of northern Colombia. It flows into the Magdalena River and on to the Caribbean Sea. The Sogamoso Dam on the river near Bucaramanga was completed in 2014.

Course 
The Sogamoso River is a river in northern Colombia, which is formed by the confluence of the Suárez River and the Chicamocha River after crossing the Chicamocha Canyon, and flows into the Magdalena River between Puerto Wilches and Barrancabermeja, and this in turn empties into the Caribbean Sea.

See also 
 List of rivers of Colombia

References

Further reading 
 

Rivers of Colombia
Magdalena River
Rivers